The 1909 Kendall Orange and Black football team represented Henry Kendall College (later renamed the University of Tulsa) during the 1909 college football season. The team compiled a 2–1 record and was outscored by its opponents by a total of 33 to 23. The team played only one intercollegiate football game, a 22-6 loss to Northeastern State. Its two victories came in games against Claremore High School.

Schedule

References

Kendall
Tulsa Golden Hurricane football seasons
Kendall Orange and Black football